PalmStar Media Capital or PalmStar Entertainment is a film and television production and financing company based in Philadelphia. It was founded by its CEO, Kevin Frakes in 2010.

History 
PalmStar Entertainment was co-founded in 2004 by Kevin Frakes and Stephan Paternot. Later in 2010, the CEO Frakes co-founded PalmStar Media Capital with Peggy Taylor and Frank Pollifrone.  In July 2017, PalmStar Media purchased all the assets of National Lampoon, Inc., including trademark and library of print, audio, movie, and video content.

Collaboration deals 
In October 2014, PalmStar Media signed on a multi-year financing deal with Basil Iwanyk's Thunder Road Pictures, and according to this agreement, Thunder Road would get $200 million funds from PalmStar Media. Thunder Road would use it to fully finance and produce five to six independent films from $20 to $50 million budget range per year.

In February 2015, PalmStar Media signed on a deal with Dylan Sellers' Rivers Edge Films to handle all company's production and development costs, and together, they would produce four to five films with budgets between $20 million to $40 million. In August 2015, PalmStar Media signed a deal with Jeremy Renner and Don Handfield's production company 'The Combine' to produce two to three films per year together.

PalmStar Media has also partnered with Anthony Bregman's Likely Story and Buddy Patrick's Windy Hill Pictures.

References 

American companies established in 2010
Film production companies of the United States
Television production companies of the United States
Companies based in Philadelphia
Mass media companies established in 2010